Robert, Bob or Bobby Boucher may refer to:
 Bob Boucher (educator) (1940–2009), British academic and vice-chancellor of the University of Sheffield from 2001 to 2007
 Bob Boucher (cyclist) (born 1943), Canadian cyclist and speed skater
 Bob Boucher (ice hockey) (1938–2004), Canadian ice hockey player and coach
 Robert Boucher (ice hockey) (1904–1931), Canadian ice hockey player who played for the Montreal Canadiens
 Bobby Boucher, a character played by Adam Sandler in The Waterboy